Events in 2001 in animation.



Events

January
 January 1: The first episode of Horrible Histories airs, which features occasional animated sequences.
 January 12: The first episode of Lizzie McGuire airs. 
 January 13: The first episode of House of Mouse airs.
 January 23: Richard Linklater's Waking Life premiers.

February
 February 2: John Callahan's Quads!, based on John Callahan's cartoons, is first broadcast.
 February 3: The first episode of Lloyd in Space airs.
 February 4: The Futurama episode "Amazon Women in the Mood" premieres, guest starring actress and comedian Bea Arthur.
 February 11:
 The Futurama episode "Bendless Love" premieres, guest starring actress and comedian Jan Hooks.
 The Simpsons episode "Tennis the Menace" premieres, guest starring Andre Agassi, Pete Sampras, Venus Williams, and Serena Williams.
 February 16: The film Recess: School's Out is released.
 February 23: Henry Selick's Monkeybone, which combines animation with live-action, is released, but to bad reviews and low audience attendances.
 February 25: The Futurama episode "That's Lobstertainment!" premieres, guest starring actor, comedian and fellow Simpsons cast member Hank Azaria. However, this episode received polarizing reception from fans and it was often regarded as one of the worst episodes of the series.

March
 March 25: 73rd Academy Awards: Father and Daughter by Michaël Dudok de Wit wins the Academy Award for Best Animated Short Film.
 March 30: 
 The first episode of The Fairly OddParents airs.
 The first episode of Invader Zim airs.

April
 April 1:
 The Futurama episode "The Cyber House Rules" premieres, in which Leela meets up with her former orphanarium playmate Adlai Atkins, now a plastic surgeon, who agrees to grant Leela surgery that will give her two eyes.
 The Simpsons episode "Simpson Safari" is broadcast, in which the family travels to Africa.
 April 4: The first episode of Titeuf airs, based on the eponymous comics series.
 April 19: Bill Plympton's Mutant Aliens is released.
 April 22: The Futurama episode "Bendin' in the Wind" premieres, guest starring musician Beck.
 April 29: The Simpsons episode "Trilogy of Error" is first broadcast, in which three connected stories from different viewpoints are told, inspired by the film Run Lola Run, all based around Homer Simpson accidentally cutting off his thumb. The episode also guest stars Malcolm in the Middle star Frankie Muniz as Thelonious.

May
 May 13: The Futurama episode "I Dated a Robot" premieres, guest starring actress Lucy Liu.
 May 18: The film Shrek premiers and becomes an unexpected box office hit.
 May 26: Rintaro's Metropolis is first released, based on Osamu Tezuka's Metropolis.

June
 June 2: The first episode of Braceface is broadcast.
 June 3: Gary Trousdale and Kirk Wise's Atlantis: The Lost Empire, produced by the Walt Disney Company, is released. It is a box office flop, but becomes a cult film later. During its 25-week theatrical run, Atlantis: The Lost Empire grossed over $186 million worldwide ($84 million from the United States and Canada). Responding to its disappointing box-office performance, Thomas Schumacher, then-president of Walt Disney Feature Animation, said, "It seemed like a good idea at the time to not do a sweet fairy tale, but we missed."
 June 8: The first episode of Time Squad airs.
 June 27: The South Park episode "Cripple Fight" premieres, featuring the debut of Jimmy Valmer. 
 June 28: The Rugrats receive a star at the Hollywood Walk of Fame.
 June 30: The first episode of What's with Andy? is broadcast.

July
 July 20: 
 The Portuguese film The Happy Cricket is released.
 Hayao Miyazaki's Spirited Away premiers.

August
 August 7: Osmosis Jones is first released.
 August 8: The South Park episode "Towelie" premieres, featuring the debut of Towelie.
 August 10: The first episode of Samurai Jack airs.
 August 24: The first episode of Grim & Evil airs.

September
 September 2: The adult-oriented block Adult Swim is launched and debuts on Cartoon Network. The first episodes of two long-running series air the same day:Harvey Birdman, Attorney at Law and Sealab 2021.
 September 3: The first episode of The Legend of Tarzan, produced by the Walt Disney Company, is broadcast.
 September 7: The SpongeBob SquarePants episode "Band Geeks", premieres on Nickelodeon.
 September 9: The first official episode of Aqua Teen Hunger Force airs, almost over a year after airing the pilot episode.
 September 14: The film The House of Morecock is released, the first gay pornographic adult animated feature film. It is directed by comics artist Joe Phillips.
 September 15: The first episode of Stanley is broadcast.
 September 15: The first episode of The Proud Family is broadcast, produced by the Walt Disney Company.
 Specific date unknown: Hanna-Barbera is absorbed into Warner Bros. Animation.

October
 October 14: The first episode of 2DTV is broadcast, which ridicules celebrities.
 October 20: The first episode of Mary-Kate and Ashley in Action! airs, an animated version of TV actresses Mary-Kate and Ashley Olsen (voicing themselves) which is cancelled after only one season.
 October 25: The film The Abrafaxe – Under The Black Flag is released, based on Lona Rietschel and Lothar Dräger's comic strip Die Abrafaxe.
 October 28: The film Monsters, Inc. by Pixar and the Walt Disney Company is released.

November
 November 3: The first episode of Totally Spies! airs.
 November 5: The final episode of Recess airs. It was supposed to end after the fifth season, but ratings gave the show one more season, which only lasted for 3 half-hours due to the show passing the 65-episode rule.
 November 7: The South Park episode "Osama bin Laden Has Farty Pants" first airs, famous for referencing the September 11 attacks and ridiculing Osama bin Laden in the style of World War II propaganda cartoons.
 November 17: The first episode of Justice League is broadcast.
 November 18: The Simpsons episode "Homer the Moe" premieres, guest starring the rock band R.E.M.

December
 December 9:
 The Futurama episode "Roswell that Ends Well" premieres, in which the Planet Express crew accidentally time traveled back to July 1947 and caused the Roswell incident. This episode received critical acclaim and the series won its first Emmy Award for Outstanding Animated Program (Programming Less Than One Hour) in 2002.
 The film Jimmy Neutron: Boy Genius is released.
 December 15: The Hong Kong film My Life as McDull is released.
 December 16: The Simpsons episode "She of Little Faith" premieres, in which Lisa Simpson becomes a Buddhist; it also guest stars Richard Gere.
 December 18: The Tell-Tale Heart is added to the National Film Registry.
 December 21: The film Momo alla conquista del tempo, an adaptation of Michael Ende's Momo is first released.
 December 23:
 The first episode of Cédric, an animated series based on the comics series Cédric airs.
 The Futurama episode "A Tale of Two Santas" premieres, guest starring rapper Coolio as Kwanzaabot. This was the first episode that John DiMaggio took over the role as Robot Santa due to John Goodman (his original voice actor in "Xmas Story") not being available to reprise.

Specific date unknown
 The film The Jar: A Tale from the East is released.

Awards
Academy Award for Best Animated Feature: Shrek
Animation Kobe Feature Film Award: Spirited Away
Annecy International Animated Film Festival Cristal du long métrage: Mutant Aliens
Annie Award for Best Animated Feature: Shrek
César Award for Best Foreign Film: Spirited Away
Golden Bear: Spirited Away
Goya Award for Best Animated Film: El bosque animado
Japan Media Arts Festival Animation Award: Spirited Away and Millennium Actress
Mainichi Film Awards - Animation Grand Award: Spirited Away
Mainichi Film Award for Best Film: Spirited Away
Japan Academy Prize for Picture of the Year: Spirited Away

Films released

 January 13 - Initial D: Third Stage (Japan)
 January 20 - Shenmue: The Movie (Japan)
 January 24 - Mutant Aliens (United States)
 February 16 - Recess: School's Out (United States)
 February 23 - Monkeybone (United States)
 February 27 - Lady and the Tramp II: Scamp's Adventure (United States)
 March 3 - One Piece: Clockwork Island Adventure (Japan)
 March 10 - Doraemon: Nobita and the Winged Braves (Japan)
 March 24 - VeggieTales: Lyle the Kindly Viking (United States)
 April 21:
 Crayon Shin-chan: The Adult Empire Strikes Back (Japan)
 Detective Conan: Countdown to Heaven (Japan)
 April 27 - Malice@Doll (Japan)
 May 11 - The Trumpet of the Swan (United States)
 May 18 - Shrek (United States)
 May 26 - Metropolis (Japan)
 May 30 - Little Potam (France)
 June 15 - Atlantis: The Lost Empire (United States)
 July 7 - Pokémon 4Ever (Japan)
 July 11 - Final Fantasy: The Spirits Within (Japan and United States)
 July 20:
 The Happy Cricket (Brazil)
 Spirited Away (Japan)
 August 3 - The Living Forest (Spain)
 August 7 - The Little Bear Movie (Canada)
 August 10 - Osmosis Jones (United States)
 August 17 - 10 + 2: The Great Secret (Spain)
 August 22 - Blue Remains (Japan)
 September 1 - Cowboy Bebop: The Movie (Japan)
 September 14:
 The House of Morecock (United States)
 Millennium Actress (Japan)
 September 15: 
 Christmas Carol: The Movie (United Kingdom and Germany)
 VeggieTales: The Ultimate Silly Song Countdown (United States)
 September 20 - Commando Stoertebeker (Germany)
 October 2 - Barbie in the Nutcracker (Canada and United States)
 October 4 - The Little Polar Bear (Germany)
 October 9 - Scooby-Doo and the Cyber Chase (United States)
 October 12 - Mr. Blot's Triumph (Poland)
 October 19 - Waking Life (United States)
 October 25:
 The Abrafaxe – Under The Black Flag (Germany) (produced in 2000)
 Putih (Malaysia)
 October 30:
 The Kid (Canada and United States)
 Rudolph the Red-Nosed Reindeer and the Island of Misfit Toys (Canada)
 November 2 - Monsters, Inc. (United States)
 November 6:
 Franklin's Magic Christmas (Canada)
 Mickey's Magical Christmas: Snowed in at the House of Mouse (United States)
 Recess Christmas: Miracle on Third Street (United States)
 November 29 - Ladybirds' Christmas (Estonia)
 December 4 - The Land Before Time VIII: The Big Freeze (United States)
 December 12 - Becassine and the Viking Treasure (France)
 December 13 - The Santa Claus Brothers (Canada and United States)
 December 15:
 Hamtaro: Adventures in Ham-Ham Land (Japan)
 InuYasha the Movie: Affections Touching Across Time (Japan)
 My Life as McDull (Hong Kong)
 December 21:
 Aida of the Trees (Italy and United Kingdom)
 Jimmy Neutron: Boy Genius (United States)
 La leyenda del unicornio (Spain)
 Momo (Italy and Germany)
 Sakura Wars: The Movie (Japan)
 December 22 - Marco Polo: Return to Xanadu (United States) (produced in 1999)
 December 31 - Fünf Wochen im Ballon (China and Germany)
 Specific date unknown: 
 Fracasse (Spain and France)
 Hay – The Gazelle Child (Arab League)
 The Jar: A Tale from the East (Syria)
 The Vœu (France)

Television series debuts

Television series endings

Births

February
 February 15: Haley Tju, American actress (voice of Lexi Kubota in Glitch Techs, Marcy Wu in Amphibia, Alia in Arlo the Alligator Boy and I Heart Arlo, Sqweep in Monsters vs. Aliens, Stella in The Loud House, Karmi in Big Hero 6: The Series, Nu Hai in Kung Fu Panda: The Paws of Destiny, Wenda in Where's Waldo?).
 February 21: Isabella Acres, American actress (voice of Jade in Sofia the First, Mary Anne Gleardan in Scooby-Doo! Mystery Incorporated, Kate in Phineas and Ferb, young Princess Bubblegum in Adventure Time, Emma Gale in Scooby-Doo! Stage Fright).

April
 April 20: Ian Alexander American actor (voice of Tai in Moon Girl and Devil Dinosaur).

June
 June 9: Xolo Maridueña, American actor (voice of Andres in Victor and Valentino, Zaid in Cleopatra in Space, Snowy the Snowcrawler in Batwheels).

July
 July 3: Avalon Robbins, American model and actress (voice of Millie Mouse and Melody Mouse in the Mickey Mouse Clubhouse episode "Minnie's Winter Bow Show", Minnie's Bow-Toons and Mickey and the Roadster Racers, Harper in the Special Agent Oso episode "Goldscooter").
 July 10: Isabela Merced, American actress (voice of Lucky Prescott in Spirit Untamed, Kate in Dora and Friends: Into the City!, Widow Queen in Maya and the Three, Heather in The Nut Job 2: Nutty by Nature).

August
 August 5: Josie Totah, American actress (voice of Prince Jin in Sofia the First, Natalie in Big Mouth and Human Resources).

September
 September 4: Tenzing Norgay Trainor, American actor (voice of Jin in Abominable and Abominable and the Invisible City).

October
 October 12: Raymond Ochoa, American actor and singer (voice of Arlo in The Good Dinosaur, young Anakin Skywalker in Robot Chicken: Star Wars Episode III, Noah in the Special Agent Oso episode "The Living Holiday Lights").
 October 17: Jake Beale, Canadian actor (voice of Mike in Mike the Knight, first voice of Daniel in Daniel Tiger's Neighborhood, continued voice of D.W. Read in Arthur).
 October 21: Ashley Liao, American actress (voice of Jun Wong in DreamWorks Dragons: The Nine Realms).

December
 December 14: Joshua Rush, American actor (voice of Bunga in The Lion Guard, Waldo in Where's Waldo?).
 December 18: Billie Eilish, American singer and songwriter (voiced herself in The Simpsons short "When Billie Met Lisa").
 December 28: Maitreyi Ramakrishnan, Canadian actress (voice of Priya Mangal in Turning Red, Zipp Storm in My Little Pony: Make Your Mark and My Little Pony: Tell Your Tale).

Deaths

January
 January 2: Alison de Vere, English animator, background designer (Halas and Batchelor, The Beatles, Yellow Submarine, The Animals of Farthing Wood) and director (The Black Dog, Psyche and Eros), dies at age 73.
 January 25: Sam Singer, American film director and producer (The Adventures of Pow Wow, The Adventures of Paddy the Pelican, Bucky and Pepito), dies at age 89.
 January 28: Don Brodie, American actor and director (voice of Devil Donald in Donald's Better Self, and Barker in Pinocchio), dies at age 96.

February
 February 8: Ivo Caprino, Norwegian film director and writer (Flaklypa Grand Prix), dies at age 80.
 February 17: John Sutherland, American animator (Walt Disney Company), voice actor (voice of young adult Bambi in Bambi) and film producer (Daffy Ditties), dies at age 90.

March
 March 1: Torsten Bjarre, Swedish animator and comics artist, dies at age 85.
 March 8: Edward Winter, American actor (voice of Dr. Buzz Kutt and Owner in Aaahh!!! Real Monsters, President, Sarge and Guard in The Real Adventures of Jonny Quest, Scientist #1 and other various characters in The Angry Beavers), dies from parkinson's disease at age 63.
 March 9: Richard Stone, American composer (Warner Bros. Animation), dies at age 47.
 March 11: Jim P. Dilworth, American animator, designer and brother of John R. Dilworth (Courage the Cowardly Dog), dies at age 42.
 March 16: Norma MacMillan, Canadian voice actress (voice of Sweet Polly Purebred in Underdog, continued voice of Gumby, Davey in Davey and Goliath and Casper the Friendly Ghost), dies at age 79.
 March 22: William Hanna, American animator, director, producer, and cartoonist (Tom & Jerry, The Flintstones, Yogi Bear, The Jetsons, Wacky Races, Scooby-Doo), co-founder of Hanna-Barbera, dies at age 90.

April
 April 3: Ray Osrin, American cartoonist, animator and comics artist, dies at age 72.
 April 15: Joey Ramone, American musician and member of the Ramones (voiced himself in The Simpsons episode "Rosebud"), dies from lymphoma at age 49.

May
 May 18: Maurice Noble, American film director, writer (Tiny Toon Adventures), production designer and background artist (Walt Disney Animation Studios, Warner Bros. Cartoons, MGM Animation/Visual Arts, DePatie-Freleng Enterprises, Poochini, Timber Wolf), dies at age 90.

June
 June 1: Hank Ketcham, American comics artist and animator (Walt Disney Company, Walter Lantz), dies at age 81.
 June 15: Hurey, Belgian animator (worked for Belvision) and comics artist, dies at age 63.
 June 19: Lee Mishkin, American animator (Calvin and the Colonel, The New 3 Stooges, The Jackson 5ive, Halloween Is Grinch Night, Yogi's Space Race, Jetsons: The Movie, The Simpsons), storyboard artist (Linus the Lionhearted, Heavy Metal) and director (Is It Always Right to Be Right?, Bionic Six), dies at age 74.
 June 24: Kent Holaday, American animator (Walt Disney Animation Studios, Maxie's World, BraveStarr, Who Framed Roger Rabbit, The New Adventures of Beany and Cecil, Mighty Mouse: The New Adventures) and lip sync artist (DIC Entertainment, The Simpsons, The New Adventures of He-Man, Captain Planet and the Planeteers, The Ren & Stimpy Show, Rocko's Modern Life, Klasky Csupo, The Critic, The Maxx, King of the Hill, Daria, Celebrity Deathmatch, Futurama, Sheep in the Big City, Baby Blues), dies at age 49.
 June 26: Paul Berry, English animator and director (The Sandman, worked for Cosgrove Hall and Henry Selick), dies at age 40.
 June 27:
 Joan Sims, English actress (voice of Mrs. Cratchit in A Christmas Carol, The Witch in The Thief and the Cobbler), dies at age 71.
 Jack Lemmon, American actor (voice of Frank Ormand in The Simpsons episode "The Twisted World of Marge Simpson"), dies from bladder cancer at age 76.

July
 July 4: Perry Kiefer, American animator (HBO Storybook Musicals, Bugs Bunny's Overtures to Disaster, Rugrats, Tiny Toon Adventures, Timon & Pumbaa), storyboard artist (Animaniacs, Rocko's Modern Life, Gargoyles, Teenage Mutant Ninja Turtles, The Tick, Pepper Ann), background artist (Animaniacs), prop designer (Gargoyles), sheet timer (Jungle Cubs) and director (101 Dalmatians: The Series), commits suicide at age 41.
 July 7: Toni Pagot, Italian comics artist, cartoonist and animator (Calimero), dies at age 79.
 July 15: Ted Berman, American animator, film director and screenwriter (Walt Disney Company), dies at age 81.
 July 16: Morris, Belgian comics artist and animation director (Daisy Town, The Ballad of the Daltons), dies at age 77.

August
 August 4: Lorenzo Music, American actor (voice of Garfield in Garfield and Friends, Tummi Gummi in Adventures of the Gummi Bears, Peter Venkman in The Real Ghostbusters) dies at age 64.
August 16: Dave Barry, American radio host and voice actor (voice of Humphrey Bogart in 8 Ball Bunny, Bluto in the Popeye cartoon Seein' Red, White 'N' Blue, Elmer Fudd in Pre-Hysterical Hare), dies at age 82.
 August 23: Kathleen Freeman, American actress (voice of Eugenia Kisskillya in Detention, Mrs. Gordon in As Told by Ginger, Mrs. Crackshell in DuckTales, Elder #1 in FernGully: The Last Rainforest, Ma in the Chip 'n Dale: Rescue Rangers episode "Short Order Crooks", Mrs. Evans in The Real Adventures of Jonny Quest episode "Return of the Anasazi", Greta in the Cow and Chicken episode "Sumo Cow", Ma Mayhem in the Batman Beyond episode "The Eggbaby"), dies from lung cancer at age 78.

September
 September 7: Billie Lou Watt, American actress and writer (voice of the title characters in Astro Boy and Kimba the White Lion, Jimmy Sparks in Gigantor, Chris Peeper, Gizmo and other various characters in Superbook, Ma Bagge and McPhearson Phantom in Courage the Cowardly Dog), dies from lung cancer at age 77.
 September 18: Ernie Coombs, American-Canadian entertainer (voice of the Narrator in Simon in the Land of Chalk Drawings), dies from a stroke at age 73.
 September 23: Robert Abel, American visual effects artist (Tron), dies at age 64.
 September 30: Bjørn Frank Jensen, Danish animator and comics artist (co-founder of Ring, Frank & Jensen, worked for Marten Toonder's animation department), dies at age 81.

October
 October 5: Jan Lenica, Polish graphic designer, cartoonist, poster illustrator and animator (Dom, A, Adam 2, Ubu et la grande gidouille), dies at age 73.
 October 6: Yuriy Meshcheryakov, Russian-Ukrainian animator (The Tale of Tsar Saltan), dies at age 55.
 October 9: Vladimir Danilevich, Russian film director (Vaniusha The Newcomer), dies at age 77.

November
 November 6: Chris Ishii, American animator and comic artist (Walt Disney Animation Studios, UPA, the 1974 Mad Magazine special, the animated segment in Woody Allen's Annie Hall), dies at age 81.
 November 12: Albert Hague, German-American songwriter and composer (How the Grinch Stole Christmas), dies at age 81.
 November 21: Seymour Reit, aka Sy Reit, American animator (Fleischer Studios, co-creator of Casper the Friendly Ghost), writer, screenwriter, comics writer and comics artist, dies at age 83.
 November 29: George Harrison, English musician, singer-songwriter and member of The Beatles (voiced himself in The Simpsons episode "Homer's Barbershop Quartet"), dies from lung cancer at age 58.

December
 December 2: Chase Craig, American animator, scriptwriter and comics writer (Warner Bros. Cartoons, Walter Lantz Productions), dies at age 91.
 December 7: Faith Hubley, American animator, storyboard artist (Mr. Magoo, co-founder of Storyboard Studios), dies at age 77 from breast cancer.
 December 11: Beverly Hope Atkinson, American actress (voice of Carol in Heavy Traffic), dies at age 66.
 December 26: Nigel Hawthorne, English actor (voice of Captain Campion in Watership Down, Dr. Boycott in The Plague Dogs, Fflewddur Fflam in The Black Cauldron, Professor Porter in Tarzan), dies at age 72.
 December 30: Ray Patterson, American animator and film director and producer (Screen Gems, Walt Disney Animation Studios, MGM Animation, Grantray-Lawrence Animation, Hanna-Barbera), dies at age 90.
 December 31: David Swift, American writer, film director and producer (Walt Disney Company), dies at age 82.

Specific date unknown
 Todd Halford, American modeler and production assistant (Mainframe Entertainment), dies at an unknown age.

See also 
 2001 in anime

References

Sources

External links 
Animated works of the year, listed in the IMDb

 
2000s in animation